Henrich Friedrich Theodor Ernst Grillo (20 December 1825, Essen – 16 April 1888, Düsseldorf-Grafenberg) was a prominent industrialist in the Ruhr area of Germany, particularly in Essen and Gelsenkirchen.

Born the son of an Essen merchant, into a Protestant family of Italian origin (his ancestors came from Valtellina, from which they fled due to religious persecutions), he took over his father's enterprise and expanded the range of trade, becoming an influential businessman. Grillo was a board member and founder of several mining companies, including the Schalker Eisenhütte (ironworks) in 1872.

Friedrich Grillo and, after his death, his widow Wilhelmine Grillo donated the property and two thirds of the construction costs of the Grillo-Theater which opened in Essen in 1892.

References

External links
 
 

1825 births
1888 deaths
Businesspeople from Essen
German industrialists
German mining businesspeople
German company founders
19th-century German businesspeople
German people of Italian descent